The Torneo Grita México Apertura 2021 (stylized as Grita... México A21) Liga MX final phase was being played between 20 November and 12 December 2021. A total of twelve teams competed in the final phase to decide the champions of the Apertura 2021 Liga MX season. For the third straight season, an additional qualifying round, the reclassification or repechaje, was employed, which expands the number of playoff spots to 12.

Both finalists qualified to the 2023 CONCACAF Champions League.

Atlas defeated León on penalty kicks to win their second title. As winners, Atlas, will face the Clausura 2022 champion in the 2022 Campeón de Campeones.

Qualified teams
The following teams qualified for the championship stage.

In the following tables, the number of appearances, last appearance, and previous best result count only those in the short tournament era starting from Invierno 1996 (not counting those in the long tournament era from 1943–44 to 1995–96).

Format

Reclassification
All rounds will be played in a single game hosted by the higher seed
If a game ends in a draw, it will proceed directly to a penalty shoot-out.

Liguilla
Teams will be re-seeded each round.
The winners of the Reclassification matches will be seeded based on their ranking in the classification table.
Team with more goals on aggregate after two matches will advance.
No away goals rule is applied in neither round, if the two teams are tied on aggregate, the higher seeded team advances.
In the final, if the two teams are tied after both legs, the match goes to extra time and, if necessary, a shoot-out.
Both finalists will qualify to the 2023 CONCACAF Champions League.

Reclassification

Summary
Matches took place on 20–21 November 2021.

|}

Matches

Seeding
The following is the final seeding for the final phase. The winners of the Reclassification matches are seeded based on their position in the classification table.

Bracket

Quarter-finals
The first legs were played on 24–25 November, and the second legs were played on 27–28 November.

|}

First leg

Second leg

UNAM won 3–1 on aggregate.

1–1 on aggregate. Atlas advanced due to being the higher seed in the classification table.

2–2 on aggregate. UANL advanced due to being the higher seed in the classification table.

León won 3–2 on aggregate.

Semi-finals
The first legs were played on 1–2 December, and the second legs were played on 4–5 December.

{{TwoLegResult|UNAM||1–1 (s)|Atlas'||0–1|1–0}}

|}

First leg

Second leg3–3 on aggregate. León advanced due to being the higher seed in the classification table.1–1 on aggregate. Atlas advanced due to being the higher seed in the classification table.Finals
The first leg was played on 9 December, and the second leg was played on 12 December.

|}

First leg

Details

Statistics

Second leg3–3 on aggregate. Atlas won on 4–3 penalty kicks''

Details

Statistics

Statistics

Goalscorers

Assists

Notes

References

 
1
Liga MX seasons